Ghatsa montana also known as the Anamalai Stone loach is a species of ray-finned fish in the genus Ghatsa. It should not be confused with Anamalai Loach (Mesonoemacheilus herrei).

References

Taxa named by Albert William Herre
Fish described in 1945
Cypriniformes